Đặng Huy Trứ (1825–1874) was a Vietnamese official of Nguyễn dynasty.

Biography
Đặng Huy Trứ has a courtesy name Hoàng Trung (黃中), pseudonym Vọng Tân (望津) or Tỉnh Trai (醒齋), nick name Sir Bố Đặng (翁布鄧 / Ông Bố Đặng) or Sir Bố Trứ (翁布𤏸 / Ông Bố Trứ). He was born on 16 May 1825 at Thanh Lương village, Hương Trà district, Thừa Thiên prefect but his ancestors from Bác Vọng village, Quảng Điền district.

Works

 Đặng Hoàng Trung ngũ giới pháp thiếp (鄧黄中五戒法帖)
 Đặng Hoàng Trung thi sao (鄧黄中詩抄)
 Đặng Hoàng Trung văn sao (鄧黄中文抄)
 Đặng Dịch Trai ngôn hành lục (鄧惕齋言行錄)
 Việt sử thánh huấn diễn nghĩa (越史聖訓演義)
 Ngũ giới diễn ca (五戒演歌)
 Sách học vấn tân (策學門津)
 Tứ giới thi (四戒詩)
 Tứ thập bát hiếu thi họa toàn tập (四十八孝詩畫全集)
 Tự trị yên đổ phương thư (自治煙賭方書)
 Bách duyệt tập (柏悅集)
 Nhĩ Hoàng di ái lục (珥潢遺愛錄)
 Tứ thư văn tuyển (四書文選)
 Từ thụ yếu quy (辭受要規)
 Dương Đình phú lược (陽亭賦略)
 Nhị vị tập (二味集)
 Thanh Khang Hi ngự đề canh chức đồ phó bản (清康熙御題耕織圖副本)
 Trương Quảng Khê thi văn (張廣溪詩文)

See also

 Lý Văn Phức
 Hoàng Kế Viêm

References

 Thivien
 鄧輝𤏸 とベトナムにおける「二十四孝原編」～～佐藤トゥイウェン
 Hai công vụ Trung Hoa của cụ Đặng Huy Trứ
 Xưa người làm quan nhận quà như thế nào

 

1825 births
1874 deaths
People from Huế
Vietnamese Confucianists
Vietnamese male poets
Nguyen dynasty officials